Malagasy people in France consist of migrants from Madagascar and their descendants living and working in France.

History                                           
The first wave of immigrants from Madagascar who came in France were soldiers recruited as colonial troops into the French Armed Forces to fight in the World Wars. After 1947, some Malagasy nationalist students came to study in parts of Europe and Asia The second wave of immigrants began in 1975, because of the political instability in Madagascar. The third wave, which began in 1990s, is composed mostly of economic migrants.

Notable people                         

Tessah Andrianjafitrimo
Franck Béria
Enzo Bovis
Nicolas Senzemba
Benoit Tremoulinas
 Ludovic Ajorque
 Yoël Armougom
 Romain Métanire

See also
 France–Madagascar relations

References                  

                              
African diaspora in France
Society of France
 
Ethnic groups in France
Immigration to France by country of origin